Exacum  is a genus of plant in family Gentianaceae. It contains the following species (but this list is incomplete):
 Exacum affine Balf.f. ex Regel
 Exacum axillare
 Exacum bicolor
 Exacum caeruleum Balf.f.
 Exacum laxiflorum (Gamble) Geethakumary, Deepu, Kissling & Pandurangan 
 Exacum pallidum
 Exacum pedunculatum
 Exacum sessile
 Exacum socotranum Balf.f.
 Exacum tetragonum
 Exacum tinervium
 Exacum travancoricum
 Exacum walkeri

References

 
Gentianaceae genera
Taxa named by Carl Linnaeus
Taxonomy articles created by Polbot